Kenneth Gordon Taylor (15 March 1931 – April 2016) was an English association football full back who played in the Football League for Blackburn Rovers.

References

1931 births
2016 deaths
Footballers from South Shields
English footballers
Association football defenders
North Shields F.C. players
Blackburn Rovers F.C. players
Morecambe F.C. players
English Football League players